The Obersee ("upper lake") is the smaller of the two parts of Zürichsee (Lake Zürich) in the cantons of St. Gallen and Schwyz in Switzerland.

Geography 

The average lake level is now at 406 metres above sea level, while Obersee and Untersee differ by only .

The Seedamm between Rapperswil and Hurden was used since about 5,000 years as a historical lake crossing. Since the 1870s a partially artificial road causeway and two bridges were added, to cross the most narrow and flatbedded area of the lake, carrying a railway line and road from Rapperswil to Pfäffikon. Seedamm divides the southeastern section of lower Zürichsee and Obersee, connected by the Hurden canal at Hurden, where also the Frauenwinkel protected area is situated. That bigger part of the Zürichsee to the west of the Seedamm, is largely situated in the canton of Zürich, smaller parts in the cantons of Schwyz and St. Gallen (Kempraten and Rapperswil), whilst the upper lake is shared just between the cantons of St. Gallen and Schwyz.

Zürichsee was formed by the Linth river, which rises in the glaciers of the Glarus Alps. In 1811 the Escher canal was completed, which diverted the Linth river into Walensee (Lake Walen) from where its waters are carried to the east end of Obersee by the Linth canal (completed in 1816), and separated by the Buechberg hill. No 
other streams of importance flow into the Obersee besides the Linth and the much smaller Jona river.

Hydrology 
Obersee is characterized by its shallow depth and, compared to its volume, by the very large inflow from the Linth canal. The theoretical residence time of water in the upper lake at medium Linth inflow is thus only around 10 weeks. In the near-surface layers of water, a slight upward trend in average temperature has been observed, resulting in the temperature stratification of the lake being more stable much longer into late summer. The increasingly warm winters result in incomplete mixing of lake water to the depths. 

The Walensee and Obersee are the main water suppliers for Zürichsee which is used in turn for more than a million inhabitants as drinking water storage. To ensure the quality of the drinking water supply, the water supply authorities of the city of Zürich therefore regularly examine the quality of these two lakes. The neighboring cantons of Zürich, Schwyz, Glarus and St. Gallen participate in the monitoring costs. Since the early 1970s the water quality has greatly improved thanks to extensive restructuring measures. Almost all residents in the  large catchment area are connected to sewage plants.

Nature

Flora 

Following a 1978 inventory, in 1988 the University of Geneva took a second inventory of aquatic plants in the riparian zone of the entire lake area. The most important are the plants environmental information on aquatic plants (macrophytes), divided into reeds, floating plants and submerged vegetation (pondweed and stoneworts). Instead of nutrients there is a high a load with floating mineral particles which prevents colonization of the sea floor in greater depths. The grade of colonization of the shallow water zone has risen again since the last observation in 1978, which is directly related to the increase in the maximum colonization zone. The vegetation consists four-fifths of submerged plants and only about one-fifth of emerging plants. The latter includes the reedbed: In 1850  of reed beds were alone in the lower lake area yet been demonstrated. A comparison of aerial photographs from 1954 and 1987 shows in most shore sections of the machining area a significant decrease in the reed beds. The reed area has increased from 1978 to 1987 in the upper lake from 15 to 16 ha. It can be concluded that the reed banks are mostly declined in the 1960s and 1970s, but that since then at a low level takes place a slight recovery. Lily as floating leaf plants covered on Untersee 0.4 ha, with a declining trend; in contrast, a doubling Obersee on 2 ha can be detected. 56 of the 61 species in the entire Zürichsee colonize the upper lake and the lower lake 34. Most frequently represented are the pondweed (Potamogeton); 24 species are considered rare, more than 15 very rarely.

Fens, open fields and parks 

In fact, there are no more original riverside forests on lake shore, except on steep slopes like the Fuchsberger Horn where a species-rich forest with oak and pine trees breeds. Also worth mentioning is the small wooded area at the far end of the upper Bollingen peninsula. Outside of urban areas, the bank is often planted with different density and broad trees stocks. Extensive shore sections are occupied by large, private gardens and parks. Although often non-native and exotic shrubs and trees species occur and the lawns usually are intensively cultivated, the upstream water habitats often form relatively low-noise buffer areas to the underlying recreation, transport and settlement areas. At several banks sections butt agricultural meadows and pastures directly to the water. However, the upper Bollingen peninsula is the only major agricultural area with lake access. All remaining grasslands have less than  lake access and are usually relatively little interference. A disadvantage often is the missing, extensively used transition to riparian vegetation.

Geotopes 

Geotopes comprise geological outcrops, boulders and river delta formations. Geological rock outcrops, i.e. scenically striking rocky ridges are found in Fuchsberg and Stafflen in Jona, Heilig Hüsli in Rapperswil and the Hörnli glacial erratic in Oberbollingen. Extensive river deltas included that of the Jona and Aabach in Schmerikon, to a lesser degree of Sägenbächlein, Wagner and Lehholz in Jona and the Linth with side channels in Schmerikon.

Fauna

Waterfowls 

Perennial systematic birdwatching and studies illustrate the importance of reed beds as an outstanding habitat for many bird species. Among the 15 most valuable ornithological reeds on Obersee include (Canton St. Gallen) Rapperswil Strandweg (rank 4), Bollingen Unter Stafflen (rank 7), Wurmsbach bay (rank 11), Wurmsbach nunnery (rank 12), and Schmerikoner Allmeind (rank 13). The extensive area of shallow water with its diverse flora and the still widespread shore trees play an extremely important role for many bird species, both as food, breeding and resting place. A critical phase in the evolution of birds is the time of moulting, during which they are more or less incapable of flying and depending on quiet water areas. The Reed warblers inhabit the seaward edges of the reed belts and need significantly more space than other reed birds. Due to the decline of the reed banks and the increase in interference from recovery operations and water sports on the lake shore, the number of breeding pairs is constantly decreasing. Today the Great reed warbler is acutely threatened. According to the Red List of endangered species in Switzerland, it is listed in the top risk category of disappearing birds whose survival in Switzerland is unlikely if the threats continue. In Obersee area are three important resting places of waders: Joner Allmeind annually depending on the water level in spring and autumn, Rapperswil in winter and Schmerikoner Allmeind in spring and autumn.

Amphibians 
Many amphibian species are dependent on both natural waters for spawning, as well as on adjacent food and wintering areas. Because the connection between these two partial habitats is interrupted by settlement patterns and transport systems, the amphibians have declined in these landscapes. With regard to a cross-linking of priority areas by the lake with the backlands, the most important amphibian spawning areas have been identified in 1997. Amphibian spawning areas of national importance are situated at the Allmeind areas in Jona and Schmerikon. At the Joner Allmeind two endangered species on the Red List (Yellow-bellied toad and Pelophylax) can be found in large to very large populations. Schmerikoner Allmeind is home to the same two endangered species. For both areas the preservation and promotion of natural corridors are required, and in Schmerikon along the Linth and the side channels a large-scale networking with Kaltenbrunner Riet and other protected areas in the Linthebene region.

Fish stocks 

The few existing inventory data are compiled by the competent fisheries overseer respectively a report in 1993. This is a rough, spatially highly generalized statement to the spawning grounds of Northern pike, Coregonus and Coregonus zugensis (commonly Albeli). In addition to these specific fishing information, ecological data and studies on the other species of fish and their habitat requirements, but also to other creatures, such as crabs and mussels is missing, no data are available.

Protected areas

Fens and moors 
For the inventory of the national fen asset protection zones, the Canton of St. Gallen evaluated and proposed, in accordance with the provisions in the national fen regulation, appropriate buffer zones, among them as fens of national importance: the lakeshore marshes west of Busskirch, Joner Allmeind marshes, the lakeside read area east of Wurmsbach, reed at Schmerikon and the reed area in front of HSR area and Knie's Kinderzoo in Rapperswil. Fens of regional and local importance include the reed area east of the Busskirch church, the reed area south of Hessenhof, the small area at the parking side of the Jona mouth (Stampf), the embankment and so-called Kormoraninsel at Stampf, as well as the bay to the west of the upper Bollingen peninsula.

Seedamm–Heilighüsli 

After the Seedamm causeway was built in 1878, the Heilig Hüsli chapel was the only remaining structure of the prehistorical and medieval lake crossings. It stood isolated in the lake and was not accessible to visitors until the reconstruction of the former wooden bridge was erected in 2001. The lake and the small islands between the chapel, the timber piles of the Rapperswil–Hurden bridge and the Seedamm are designated as a nature reserve. Together with an artificial island made of gravel, they form one of the most important waterfowl breeding areas. For this reason, fishing from the wooden bridge is prohibited, as is swimming and mooring boats in the area. Among the area around the Seedamm lake crossing and between Rapperswil and Busskirch, there are some more protected areas around Obersee.

Frauenwinkel 

The Frauenwinkel protected area is situated on the Seedamm area in Hurden. Landward there is reed vegetation with large and small sedge flora, rushes, Iris sibirica, and the rare Gentiana pneumonanthe. In certain places even transition and high marsh occurs. In the nature reserve there are European rarities, among them Phengaris alcon, Eurasian curlew and Gentiana pneumonanthe, as well as Ruspolia nitidula, a small snail.

Nuoler Ried 
Nuoler Ried is a reed located on the north end of a large plane that was filled by the Wägitaler Aa and Spreitenbach streams. This delta is larger than those of Frauenwinkel or of the Jona river and Wurmsbach stream. The present marshes only comprise a small fraction of the formerly extensive, extensively used reed and meadows which offered numerous animals and plants a wide habitat. Larger areas of the present nature reserve, such as the so-called Schüttinsel, were created on the deposits of non-recyclable residual material from the nearby gravel extraction.

Schmerikoner Ried 

Schmerikoner Ried is a reed located on the northeastern lake shore in the Linthebene area towards the Grynau Castle. The protected area was set under federal protection as a low-moor bog of national importance (German: Bundesinventar der Flachmoore von nationaler Bedeutung) in 1994.

Güntliweid–Bätzimatt (Buechberg) 

On the southwestern side, between Grynau and Lachen there is namely the bird reserves of national importance Güntliweid up to Bätzimatt at Buechberg.  The reserve is located on the south lake shore, at the foothills of Buechberg, and extends from the south of Bätzimatt at Schmerikon to Güntliweid east of Lachen. It is considered as a particularly valuable resting place for waders, and may be obtained as resting place for waders on the train, although there is a quarry that mines Bollinger Sandstein.

Bollingen Sandstone 

Bollinger Sandstein (German name) or Bollingen Sandstone is a sandstone found on Obersee lake shore, namely between Bollingen and Uznach and the Buechberg area, in the cantons of St. Gallen and Schwyz. Depending on the layer, the appearance and texture of the natural stone also varies, therefore distinct names have developed at the different mining locations: Güntliweid, Buechberg and Uznaberg. Bollinger-Lehholz sandstone is mined between Jona and Bollingen. For example, the present Lehholz quarry dates back to 1252 AD when Rudolf II von Rapperswil founded the nearby Wurmsbach Abbey in Jona. It was transferred with oxen to the lake shore transshipping point to be shipped with so-called Ledi boats towards the present Sechsläutenplatz Zürich far into the 19th century. Particularly the present municipality of Zürich used the Bollingen quarries for the construction of countless public and private buildings, for example, the cathedral towers and the city fortifications, or the Zunfthaus zur Meisen that was built in 1757 with stone from the Buechberg quarry. It was also used for the Fraumünster and Grossmünster churches in Zürich, as well as for the Einsiedeln and St. Gallen abbeys.

Transport and tourism 

The Zürichsee-Schifffahrtsgesellschaft – the Lake Zürich Navigation Company – provides with its 17-passenger ships touristic services on Lake Zürich and also on Obersee, as well as the much smaller Hensa AG, based in Rapperswil.

Public transport for the Seedamm area is provided by the S-Bahn Zürich lines S5 (ZVV) and S40 (ZVV), and by the Südostbahn respectively S-Bahn St. Gallen line S6 and Voralpen-Express towards Schmerikon, although just a handful railway stations is still operated on lake shore in Hurden, Rapperswil railway station and the train station in Schmerikon. The southern lake shore on the area of the canton of Schwyz, between Pfäffikon and Siebnen-Wangen, is provided by the S-Bahn Zürich lines S8 (ZVV) and S25 (ZVV). Buses are operated on both sides of the lake by the local Postauto providers and on the northeastern shore by the Verkehrsbetriebe Zürichsee und Oberland respectively also the local buses within Rapperswil-Jona.

The pathway between Rapperswil and Schmerikon, and the wooden bridge in the Seedamm area are very popular for hiking, as well as the 'fishing village' Hurden on its southern side is often frequented by tourists. Knie's Kinderzoo situated on lake shore in Rapperswil, Busskirch, Wurmsbach Abbey and Bollingen in Jona towards Schmerikon are other points of interests on the northeastern lake shore. From Tuggen there's also a historical road heading from the former granary at the Grynau Castle over the Buechberg hill towards Siebnen. In general, the southern side of the lake is not as developed for tourism, although the Lachen lido is very popular. Also often frequented is the lido of Schmerikon at the Linth canal's estuary.

The private airfield Wangen-Lachen is located inmidst the protected area Nuoler Ried on the southern shore of the lake. The adjacent nature reserve Wägitaler Aa is a breeding ground paradise for various rare species of birds. In 1949 a private pilot, a flight instructor and the aviation pioneer Alfred Comte entered into a lease agreement with the Genossame (cooperative) Wangen. On 29 June 1950 for the first time a plane landed on the grass runway of the airfield. Since 1957 also seaplanes use the lake shore area, being today – the Ad Astra Aero airport at Zürichhorn was closed around 1931 – the last water airfield in Switzerland. The airfield track has been paved in 1967, and the airport is equipped with a VASI approach aid.

The boat density on the lake is by far the highest in Switzerland: around 3,000 private boats (1.44 boats per hectare) according to studies of 1978/79 and 1.21 boats per hectare in 1972 on an area of  resulting in considerable disturbances to wildlife and the riparian vegetation by the private boat traffic, as well as by the airfield.

Disturbance of wildlife and riparian vegetation by extensive recreational use
Disturbance sensitive species are those which have a large flight distance, such as Grebes and Little grebes, Common moorhen, Water rail, Gadwall and Tufted duck. These animals leave in disorders rapidly their habitat, return either not or return with some delay, only after elimination of the fault. During the plumage change frequent disruptions for waterfowl can have deadly consequences. Also important are the widest possible retreat as cover for frightened animals.

Many of the most attractive landscapes shore of Zürichsee are located in the section of the Canton of St. Gallen. Accordingly, there is rush of boats from the lower lake area, i.e. west of the Seedamm isthmus, on nice summer days. The environmentally sensitive Wurmsbach bay is a popular anchoring and bathing place, which represents a potential failure and thus a conflict with the high value of the shore habitats. Disorders also produce sport canoeists, leisure boats and surfboards that circulate too close to the shore. Very vulnerable with respect to disturbances mentioned are the valuable shore sections on both sides of the harbour at the Rapperswil lido. Therefore, the marinecontrol regulations prohibit to motorboats shore independent movements within the  zone and slow driving within the  zone. Individual bank sections are marked with yellow buoys, which means that these zones are closed to all vessels. The maritime police's mission is to enforce these rules.

Tuggenersee 

Once a section of the Obersee area, the former easterly lake Tuggen was landed in the early 16th century AD and for the last time mentioned in 1535 AD. Parts of the former lake were situated in the Canton of Glarus, the larger western area in the canton of St. Gallen towards Uznach. In much earlier era, Obersee and Tuggenersee also were separated by the Buechberg hill, on those eastern side the Grynau Castle is situated.

See also 
 Seedamm
 Holzbrücke Rapperswil-Hurden
 Prehistoric pile dwellings around Zürichsee
 Obersee Nachrichten 
 Zürichsee-Zeitung

Literature 
 Erholungslandschaft Zürichsee. ILF Schriftenreihe Nr. 11. Published by Institut für Landschaft und Freiraum HSR et al., Rapperswil 2014, . 
 Ivo Auf der Maur (Hg.): Columban von Luxeuil, Mönchsregeln. eos Klosterverlag, St. Ottilien 2007 .
 2000 ganz farbige Seiten. Von den Neandertalern im Drachenloch bis zu den Alamannen im Thurtal (Volume 1). Kantonaler Lehrmittelverlag, St. Gallen.

References

External links 

 Obersee on the website of the canton of St. Gallen 
 

Lake Zurich
Lakes of the canton of St. Gallen
Lakes of the canton of Schwyz